Alchemilla monticola, also called hairy lady's mantle, is a species of plant belonging to the family Rosaceae.

It is native range extends from Europe to Siberia and Central China.

References

monticola